is the debut album by singer and cellist Kanon Wakeshima. The album was preceded by two singles: "Still Doll" and "Suna no Oshiro". Both of those singles were used in the anime Vampire Knight. The success of those singles led to Kanon being nominated for the Best Newcomer award at the fourth annual Shōjo Beat Music Awards.

The album was released on February 11, 2009 in Germany, France, and Europe, and on February 18, 2009 in Japan in both Limited and Regular editions. The limited edition of the CD came with a DVD of her videos "Suna No Oshiro", and "Still Doll".

Track listing

Personnel
 Kanon Wakeshima – Vocals, Cello, Piano, Lyrics
 Mana – Production

References 

2009 debut albums
Neoclassical albums